The Lepidoptera of the Faroe Islands consist of both the butterflies and moths recorded from the Faroe Islands.

According to a recent estimate, there are a total of 111 Lepidoptera species present in the Faroe Islands.

Butterflies
There are no butterflies on the Faroe Islands.

Moths

Coleophoridae
Coleophora glaucicolella Wood, 1892

Coleophoridae
Coleophora versurella Zeller, 1849

Crambidae
Catoptria furcatellus (Zetterstedt, 1839)
Catoptria margaritella (Denis & Schiffermuller, 1775)
Crambus ericella (Hübner, 1813)
Crambus pascuella (Linnaeus, 1758)
Loxostege sticticalis (Linnaeus, 1761)
Nomophila noctuella (Denis & Schiffermuller, 1775)
Scoparia ambigualis (Treitschke, 1829)
Udea ferrugalis (Hübner, 1796)
Udea lutealis (Hübner, 1809)

Elachistidae
Depressaria badiella (Hübner, 1796)

Erebidae
Arctia caja (Linnaeus, 1758)
Catocala fraxini (Linnaeus, 1758)
Euproctis chrysorrhoea (Linnaeus, 1758)
Scoliopteryx libatrix (Linnaeus, 1758)

Gelechiidae
Scrobipalpa samadensis (Pfaffenzeller, 1870)

Geometridae
Abraxas grossulariata (Linnaeus, 1758)
Chloroclysta miata (Linnaeus, 1758)
Chloroclysta siterata (Hufnagel, 1767)
Dysstroma citrata (Linnaeus, 1761)
Dysstroma truncata (Hufnagel, 1767)
Entephria caesiata (Denis & Schiffermuller, 1775)
Eupithecia nanata (Hübner, 1813)
Eupithecia pusillata (Denis & Schiffermuller, 1775)
Eupithecia satyrata (Hübner, 1813)
Eupithecia venosata (Fabricius, 1787)
Mesotype didymata (Linnaeus, 1758)
Nycterosea obstipata (Fabricius, 1794)
Operophtera brumata (Linnaeus, 1758)
Perizoma albulata (Denis & Schiffermuller, 1775)
Perizoma blandiata (Denis & Schiffermuller, 1775)
Thera cognata (Thunberg, 1792)
Xanthorhoe decoloraria (Esper, 1806)
Xanthorhoe designata (Hufnagel, 1767)
Xanthorhoe fluctuata (Linnaeus, 1758)

Gracillariidae
Aspilapteryx tringipennella (Zeller, 1839)

Hepialidae
Hepialus humuli (Linnaeus, 1758)

Noctuidae
Agrochola circellaris (Hufnagel, 1766)
Agrotis ipsilon (Hufnagel, 1766)
Agrotis segetum (Denis & Schiffermuller, 1775)
Amphipoea crinanensis (Burrows, 1908)
Amphipoea lucens (Freyer, 1845)
Amphipyra tragopoginis (Clerck, 1759)
Anaplectoides prasina (Denis & Schiffermuller, 1775)
Anarta trifolii (Hufnagel, 1766)
Apamea crenata (Hufnagel, 1766)
Apamea exulis (Lefebvre, 1836)
Apamea monoglypha (Hufnagel, 1766)
Apamea remissa (Hübner, 1809)
Autographa gamma (Linnaeus, 1758)
Autographa pulchrina (Haworth, 1809)
Celaena haworthii (Curtis, 1829)
Cerapteryx graminis (Linnaeus, 1758)
Diarsia mendica (Fabricius, 1775)
Enargia paleacea (Esper, 1788)
Eupsilia transversa (Hufnagel, 1766)
Eurois occulta (Linnaeus, 1758)
Hada plebeja (Linnaeus, 1761)
Helotropha leucostigma (Hübner, 1808)
Hydraecia micacea (Esper, 1789)
Hypocoena stigmatica (Eversmann, 1855)
Lycophotia porphyrea (Denis & Schiffermuller, 1775)
Mamestra brassicae (Linnaeus, 1758)
Mesapamea secalis (Linnaeus, 1758)
Mniotype adusta (Esper, 1790)
Mythimna unipuncta (Haworth, 1809)
Noctua orbona (Hufnagel, 1766)
Noctua pronuba (Linnaeus, 1758)
Parastichtis suspecta (Hübner, 1817)
Peridroma saucia (Hübner, 1808)
Phlogophora meticulosa (Linnaeus, 1758)
Rhizedra lutosa (Hübner, 1803)
Spodoptera exigua (Hübner, 1808)
Standfussiana lucernea (Linnaeus, 1758)
Trigonophora flammea (Esper, 1785)
Xanthia icteritia (Hufnagel, 1766)
Xestia c-nigrum (Linnaeus, 1758)
Xestia alpicola (Zetterstedt, 1839)
Xylena vetusta (Hübner, 1813)

Oecophoridae
Endrosis sarcitrella (Linnaeus, 1758)
Hofmannophila pseudospretella (Stainton, 1849)

Plutellidae
Plutella xylostella (Linnaeus, 1758)
Rhigognostis annulatella (Curtis, 1832)
Rhigognostis senilella (Zetterstedt, 1839)

Pterophoridae
Amblyptilia acanthadactyla (Hübner, 1813)
Emmelina monodactyla (Linnaeus, 1758)
Stenoptilia bipunctidactyla (Scopoli, 1763)

Pyralidae
Dioryctria abietella (Denis & Schiffermuller, 1775)
Ephestia kuehniella Zeller, 1879
Plodia interpunctella (Hübner, 1813)

Sphingidae
Acherontia atropos (Linnaeus, 1758)
Agrius convolvuli (Linnaeus, 1758)
Hyles euphorbiae (Linnaeus, 1758)
Hyles gallii (Rottemburg, 1775)
Hyles livornica (Esper, 1780)

Tineidae
Monopis laevigella (Denis & Schiffermuller, 1775)
Tinea pallescentella Stainton, 1851

Tortricidae
Acleris aspersana (Hübner, 1817)
Acleris comariana (Lienig & Zeller, 1846)
Acleris maccana (Treitschke, 1835)
Acleris notana (Donovan, 1806)
Acleris sparsana (Denis & Schiffermuller, 1775)
Bactra lancealana (Hübner, 1799)
Eana osseana (Scopoli, 1763)
Epinotia caprana (Fabricius, 1798)
Epinotia mercuriana (Frolich, 1828)
Epinotia solandriana (Linnaeus, 1758)
Lobesia littoralis (Westwood & Humphreys, 1845)
Phiaris schulziana (Fabricius, 1776)
Zeiraphera griseana (Hübner, 1799)

External links
Fauna Europaea

Lepidoptera
Lepidoptera
Faroe Islands
 Faroe Islands